Supervoksen is a Danish comedy-drama from 2006. It is the first feature film from director Christina Rosendahl.

Plot
Rebekka Claudia and Sofie are 15 years old and in high school. In class, they learn how different cultures mark the transition from childhood to adulthood. Deciding that confirmation is meaningless, they decide to create their own rite of passage, which involves choosing at random a dare from a cootie catcher. Attempting to perform their dares leads each girl towards maturity. Claudia learns she deserves respect in her romantic relationships, Sofie begins to accept her attraction to women, and Rebekka realises she is not the adult she assumed herself to be.

Cast
Emma Leth ....  Rebekka
Cathrine Bjørn ....  Sofie
Amalie Lindegård ....  Claudia
Nikolaj Coster-Waldau ....Martin

References

External links 
 

2006 films
2006 comedy-drama films
Danish LGBT-related films
Lesbian-related films
2000s Danish-language films
2006 LGBT-related films
LGBT-related comedy-drama films
Films directed by Christina Rosendahl